Aphaenandra is a monospecific genus of flowering plants in the family Rubiaceae. The type species is Aphaenandra sumatrana, now considered a synonym of Aphaenandra uniflora. The genus is found from Thailand, Myanmar (Burma), Laos, Vietnam, Java and Sumatra.

References

External links 
 Aphaenandra in the World Checklist of Rubiaceae

Monotypic Rubiaceae genera
Mussaendeae
Flora of Indo-China
Flora of Sumatra
Flora of Java